En Rajangam is a 1994 Tamil language comedy drama film directed and produced by Siraj. The film stars Anandaraj, Ramarjun, Vinodhini and Sreeja, with Jaishankar, Ravichandran, Eashwar, Shanmugasundaram, Vennira Aadai Moorthy and Thyagu playing supporting roles. It was released on 18 March 1994.

Plot

Gopalakrishnan is an honest and naive police constable who lives with his only sister Sugandhi. Sugandhi and her classmate Suresh (Ramarjun) quarrel for small matters. Meanwhile, Gopalakrishnan and Kalyani squabble whenever they meet. One day, Kalyani's mother dies and Gopalakrishnan brings her at his home. Later, Suresh and Sugandhi fall in love with each other and they get married secretly. Suresh's mother is later killed and the innocent Gopalakrishnan is arrested. Suresh discovers that the murder was planned by the corrupt politician Kodandam. What transpires later forms the crux of the story.

Cast

Anandaraj as Gopalakrishnan
Ramarjun as Suresh
Vinodhini as Sugandhi
Sreeja as Kalyani
Jaishankar as Chief Minister
Ravichandran as Kodandam
Eashwar
Shanmugasundaram as Shanmugam
Vennira Aadai Moorthy as Mayilsamy
Thyagu
Rocky
Thalapathy Dinesh as DSP
Babuji
Sangeeta as Suresh's mother
Sharmili
Harini
Loose Mohan as Sadagopan
Thayir Vadai Desigan
Kovai Senthil

Soundtrack

The film score and the soundtrack were composed by Deva. The soundtrack, released in 1994, features 5 tracks with lyrics written by Kalidasan.

References

1994 films
1990s Tamil-language films
Films scored by Deva (composer)